Death in Venice is a 1971 historical drama film directed and produced by Italian filmmaker Luchino Visconti, adapted by Visconti and Nicola Badalucco from the 1912 novella of the same name by German author Thomas Mann. It stars Dirk Bogarde as Gustav von Aschenbach and Björn Andrésen as Tadzio, with supporting roles played by Mark Burns, Marisa Berenson and Silvana Mangano. It was filmed in Technicolor by Pasqualino De Santis, with a soundtrack featuring classical composers such as Gustav Mahler, Ludwig van Beethoven and Modest Mussorgsky. It is the second part of Visconti's thematic "German Trilogy"—preceded by The Damned (1969) and followed by Ludwig (1973).

The film premiered in London on 1 March 1971, and was entered into the Cannes Film Festival. It received positive reviews from critics and won several accolades, including BAFTA Awards for Best Cinematography, Best Production Design, Best Costume Design, and Best Sound. It was nominated for Best Film, Best Direction, and Best Actor in a Leading Role for Dirk Bogarde. Visconti won the David di Donatello for Best Director.

In 2012, Death in Venice was ranked the 235th greatest film of all time in the Sight & Sound critics' poll.

In 2010, the film was ranked the 14th greatest art house film of all time by The Guardian. In 2016, it was ranked the 27th greatest LGBT film of all time in the British Film Institute poll.

Plot
Composer Gustav von Aschenbach travels to Venice for rest, due to serious health concerns. During the ship's arrival, an importunate and conspicuously made-up older man molests Aschenbach with suggestive gestures and phrases, whereupon Aschenbach turns away indignantly. Aschenbach takes quarters in the beachside Grand Hotel des Bains on the Lido di Venezia. While awaiting dinner in the hotel's lobby, he notices a group of young Poles and their governess mother, and becomes spellbound by the handsome boy Tadzio, whose casual dress and demeanor distinguishes him from his modest sisters. Tadzio's image causes Aschenbach to recall an increasingly emotional and violent conversation with his friend and student Alfred, in which they question whether beauty is created artistically or naturally and if beauty, as a natural phenomenon, is superior to art.

In the following days, Aschenbach observes Tadzio playing and bathing, and manages to get close to him in the hotel's elevator; Tadzio seems to throw a lascivious look at Aschenbach while exiting the lift. Returning to his room in an agitated state, Aschenbach remembers a particularly personal argument with Alfred, and he hesitantly decides to leave Venice. However, when his luggage is swapped at the train station, he is relieved and delighted at the prospect of returning to the hotel in order to be near Tadzio again. Before his return, he sees an emaciated man collapse in the station concourse. When Aschenbach attempts to investigate this, the flattering hotel manager speaks in a dismissive matter of exaggerated scandals in the foreign press.

Aschenbach adopts Tadzio as an artistic muse, but fails to platonically master his passion for him and frequently loses himself in daydreams of the unattainable boy; when a travel agency employee on Piazza San Marco hesitantly reports to Aschenbach that a cholera epidemic is sweeping through Venice, Aschenbach's attention falters and he fantasizes of warning Tadzio's mother of the danger while stroking her son's head. Though the two never converse, Tadzio notices that he is being watched and reacts by giving mysterious looks and poses. Aschenbach follows Tadzio and his family to St Mark's Basilica, where he observes him praying. Aschenbach gets a makeover from a chatty hairdresser, giving him a resemblance to the pushy fop that had pestered him upon his arrival. He pursues Tadzio's family again until he collapses near a well and cries out in despair. Back in his hotel room, Aschenbach dreams of a booed performance in Munich and Alfred's accusations.

When Aschenbach learns that Tadzio's family will be leaving, he weakly makes his way to a nearly deserted beach, where he watches with concern as Tadzio's game with an older boy degenerates into a wrestling match. Upon recovering, Tadzio strolls and wades through the seawater to the enraptured tones of Mahler's Adagietto. He slowly turns and looks toward the dying Aschenbach, then raises his arm and points toward the distance. Aschenbach tries to rise, but collapses dead in his deck chair.

Cast

Adaptation
While the character Aschenbach in the novella is an author, Visconti changed his profession from writer to composer. This allows the musical score, in particular the Adagietto from the Fifth Symphony by Gustav Mahler, which opens and closes the film, and sections from Mahler's Third Symphony, to represent Aschenbach's writing. Apart from this change, the film is relatively faithful to the book, but with added scenes where Aschenbach and a musician friend debate the degraded aesthetics of his music.

Production 

In the second volume of his autobiography, Snakes and Ladders, Bogarde recounts how the film crew created his character's deathly white skin for the final scenes of the film, just as he dies. The makeup department tried various face paints and creams, none of which were satisfactory, as they smeared. When a suitable cream was found and the scenes were shot, Bogarde recalls that his face began to burn terribly. The tube of cream was found and written on the side was "Keep away from eyes and skin": the director had ignored this and had been testing it out, as small patches, on various members of the film crew, before finally having it applied to Bogarde's face.

In another volume of his memoirs, An Orderly Man, Dirk Bogarde relates that, after the finished film was screened for them by Visconti in Los Angeles, the Warner Bros. executives wanted to write off the project, fearing it would be banned in the United States for obscenity because of its subject matter. They eventually relented when a gala premiere of Death in Venice was organized in London, with Elizabeth II and Princess Anne attending, to gather funds for the sinking Italian city.

Björn Andrésen 
In 2003, Andrésen gave an interview to The Guardian in which he expressed his dislike of the fame Death in Venice brought him and how he sought to distance himself from the objectifying image he acquired from playing Tadzio. He stated that he now disapproves of the film's subject matter: "Adult love for adolescents is something that I am against in principle. Emotionally perhaps, and intellectually, I am disturbed by it – because I have some insight into what this kind of love is about". He also recounted attending the film's premiere at the Cannes Film Festival: "I was just 16 and Visconti and the team took me to a gay nightclub. Almost all the crew were gay. The waiters at the club made me feel very uncomfortable. They looked at me uncompromisingly as if I was a nice meaty dish...it was the first of many such encounters".

In 2021, Juno Films released The Most Beautiful Boy in the World, a tell-all documentary in which Andrésen recollects the years of predatory and pedophilic behavior he received from the cast, crew, and fans of the film.

Critical reception
Contemporary reviews when the film was released were mixed.  For instance, Roger Ebert wrote: "I think the thing that disappoints me most about Luchino Visconti's "Death in Venice" is its lack of ambiguity. Visconti has chosen to abandon the subtleties of the Thomas Mann novel and present us with a straightforward story of homosexual love, and although that's his privilege, I think he has missed the greatness of Mann's work somewhere along the way". On review aggregator website Rotten Tomatoes, the film has an approval rating of 70% based on 27 reviews, with an average rating of 7.1/10. The website's critics consensus reads: "Luchino Visconti's Death in Venice is one of his emptier meditations on beauty, but fans of the director will find his knack for sumptuous visuals remains intact".

Derek Malcolm, in his 1971 review for The Guardian wrote: "It is a very slow, precise, and beautiful film, ... an immensely formidable achievement, engrossing in spite of any doubts".

Film historian Lawrence J. Quirk wrote in his study The Great Romantic Films (1974): "Some shots of Björn Andrésen, the Tadzio of the film, could be extracted from the frame and hung on the walls of the Louvre or the Vatican in Rome". He says Andrésen did not represent just a pretty youngster as an object of perverted lust, but that novelist Mann and director-screenwriter Visconti intended him as a symbol of beauty in the realm of Michelangelo's David or Leonardo da Vinci's Mona Lisa, the beauty that moved Dante to "seek ultimate aesthetic catharsis in the distant figure of Beatrice".

In his 2003 review for The Guardian, Peter Bradshaw hailed Dirk Bogarde's performance as one of the greatest of all time.

In 2011, writer Will Aitken published Death in Venice: A Queer Film Classic, a critical analysis of the film, as part of Arsenal Pulp Press's Queer Film Classics series.

On September 1, 2018, the film was screened in the Venice Classics section at the 75th Venice International Film Festival. The film was released by the Criterion Collection featuring a remastered edition on Blu-Ray on February 19, 2019.

On January 29, 2021, a documentary about Björn Andrésen, The Most Beautiful Boy in the World, premiered at the Sundance Film Festival.

Awards and honors

See also
 Parodied as Death in Bognor by The Goodies
 Visually referenced in a parody in Ken Russell's 1974 film Mahler. At about five minutes into the film, Mahler looks out of his railway carriage and sees a boy in a sailor uniform ('Tadzio') dreamily wandering around the platform while a man dressed in white ('Aschenbach') sits coyly on a bench, watching the boy. The Adagietto from the Fifth Symphony plays during this scene. Russell apparently disliked Visconti's film.

Notes

References

Further reading

External links 

 
 
 
 
 Death in Venice: Ruinous Infatuation – an essay by Dennis Lim at The Criterion Collection

1971 films
1971 drama films
1971 LGBT-related films
1970s English-language films
1970s historical drama films
English-language French films
English-language Italian films
Films à clef
Films about classical music and musicians
Films about sexual repression
Films about viral outbreaks
Films based on German novels
Films based on works by Thomas Mann
Films directed by Luchino Visconti
Films set in 1911
Films set on beaches
Films set in hotels
Films set in Venice
French historical drama films
French LGBT-related films
Gustav Mahler
Italian historical drama films
Italian LGBT-related films
LGBT-related drama films
1970s Italian films
1970s French films